The 1946 Raglan by-election was a by-election held in the  electorate on 5 March 1946 during the term of the 27th New Zealand Parliament. The by-election was caused by the death of Labour Party representative Robert Coulter, and was won by Hallyburton Johnstone of the National Party in a close result.

Background

The electorate Raglan was a mixture of rural and urban areas, and known as quite marginal. Rural households in the electorate were often quite remote, and this remoteness could swing the results of the election to the party with better campaigners.

The by-election was caused by the death of Labour MP Robert Coulter on 31 December 1945.

Campaign

The campaign for Raglan was tightly fought, and it was believed that the result of the by-election could be a pointer to the results of the general election later that year. In addition to the candidates, politicians of high authority on both sides campaigned throughout the electorate in the interest of canvassing more voters. One of those figures was prime minister Peter Fraser.

Results

The provisional results were compiled on the day of the election and had Johnstone leading Baxter by 194 votes. 378 absentee ballots and 152 postal votes were missing from this provisional count.

The full results of the election had come in by 13 March and suggested a win by Johnstone with a majority of 308 votes. The final outcome was decided by the electoral court.

Aftermath

Labour stayed in office in the general election later that year, albeit by a decreased margin. The same two candidates Johnstone and Baxter competed at Raglan, Baxter commanding a lead of just 39 votes at the final count, a loss of 6 votes from the preliminary count. Two further rulings going well into 1947 culminated in Baxter's majority been reduced to a mere 13 votes.

References 

Raglan 1946
1946 elections in New Zealand
Politics of Waikato
March 1946 events in New Zealand